Edmund Mervin  was a 16th century English priest.

Mervin was educated at Corpus Christi College, Oxford. He held livings at Bramshott and Sutton. He was appointed  Archdeacon of Surrey by Edward Wedlake on 18 December 1556 and deprived by Queen Elizabeth in 1559.

References

Alumni of Corpus Christi College, Oxford
Archdeacons of Surrey
16th-century English people
People from Bramshott